Sprague Grayden (born July 21, 1980) is an American actress. She played schoolteacher Heather Lisinski in the television drama Jericho, Karen Kawalski in John Doe, first daughter Olivia Taylor in the television thriller 24, and Kristi Rey in the films Paranormal Activity 2 and 3.

Biography
Grayden was born in Manchester, Massachusetts, to two schoolteachers. Sprague is her mother's maiden name. She had a younger brother, Benjamin Grayden, who died in 1999 due to injuries sustained in a fall. Grayden graduated with a degree in American Studies from Barnard College, where she also performed in the drama department. In January 2013, she announced she had married her 24 co-star Alexis "Lex" Cassar. 
She gave birth to their son in September 2014. She describes herself as a science fiction geek and likes to collect Pez dispensers. Grayden endorsed Senator Bernie Sanders for president in the 2016 U.S. presidential election.

Career
She was a performing member of the drama department at Barnard College, Columbia University. Her theater credits include productions of Hopscotch: The New York Sex Comedy, Eve Ensler's The Vagina Monologues, Sam Shepard's Fool for Love, Hamlet, Clifford Odets' Waiting for Lefty, and Ordinary Day. In 2006, she was cast as Heather Lisinski in the cult hit post-apocalypse drama Jericho. She was also cast as Donna Winston in the outlaw biker series Sons of Anarchy. In 2010 Grayden was cast as Kristi Rey in Paranormal Activity 2 and its sequel Paranormal Activity 3, while appearing in archive footage in the fourth film of the series. Grayden's other television credits include guest appearances on Crossing Jordan, One Tree Hill, CSI: NY, Private Practice, CSI: Miami, Criminal Minds, Law & Order: Los Angeles, House M.D., Grey's Anatomy, Just Add Magic, and Major Crimes.

In 2009, USA Today called her "one of TV's most interesting young actresses".

In 2019, Grayden stars in the movie Samir with Ethan Rains, Michelle Lukes, and Peter Greene.

Filmography

Film

Television

References

External links
 
 

1980 births
20th-century American actresses
21st-century American actresses
Actresses from Massachusetts
American film actresses
American stage actresses
American television actresses
Barnard College alumni
Living people
People from Manchester-by-the-Sea, Massachusetts